Edward William May Jr. (November 10, 1916 – January 22, 2004) was an American composer, arranger and trumpeter. He composed film and television music for The Green Hornet (1966), The Mod Squad (1968), Batman (with Batgirl theme, 1967), and Naked City (1960). He collaborated on films such as Pennies from Heaven (1981), and orchestrated Cocoon, and Cocoon: The Return, among others.

May wrote arrangements for many top singers, including Frank Sinatra, Yma Sumac, Nat King Cole, Anita O'Day, Peggy Lee, Vic Damone, Bobby Darin, Johnny Mercer, Ella Fitzgerald, Louis Prima, Keely Smith, Jack Jones, Bing Crosby, Sandler and Young, Nancy Wilson, Rosemary Clooney, The Andrews Sisters and Ella Mae Morse. He also collaborated with satirist Stan Freberg on several classic 1950s and 1960s comedy music albums.

As a trumpet player in the 1940s Big Band era, May recorded such songs as "Measure for Measure", "Long Tall Mama", and "Boom Shot", with Glenn Miller and His Orchestra, and "The Wrong Idea", "Lumby", and "Wings Over Manhattan" with Charlie Barnet and His Orchestra. With his own band, he had a hit single, "Charmaine". In the 1950s he released several successful albums of his unique orchestral arrangements and compositions, including Sorta-May and Sorta-Dixie.

Early life and music
May was born in Pittsburgh, Pennsylvania. He started out playing the tuba in the high school band. "I sat in the rear of the stand," he said. "I didn't realize it at the time, but I was intrigued with becoming an arranger and an orchestrator." At the age of 17, he began playing with Gene Olsen's Polish-American Orchestra.

Swing Era, Big Bands

After playing with a few local bands, May heard Charlie Barnet's band on the radio in his hometown of Pittsburgh. In the summer of 1938, he approached Barnet and asked if he could write arrangements for him. From 1938 to 1940, when swing music was taking off, he arranged and played trumpet for Barnet's big band.

His arrangement of the Ray Noble composition "Cherokee" became a major hit of the swing music era. During the Barnet days, May revealed a significant flair for satire on his composition "The Wrong Idea", composed with Barnet, ridiculing the bland "Mickey Mouse" style of "safe" big-band music, with specific aim at bandleader Sammy Kaye, known for his "swing and sway" trademark (which May's tongue-in-cheek lyrics referenced as "swing and sweat with Charlie Barnet").

Bandleader Glenn Miller hired May away from Barnet in 1940. "May points out that he was not responsible for any of the [Glenn Miller] band's signature hits, but he did write the beautiful left-field introduction to [Bill] Finegan's [arrangement of] 'Serenade In Blue'".

Miller and May had a wary relationship. According to Will Friedwald, by 1942 May was ready to resign from the Miller band. Miller refused to record half of May's arrangements, and May objected to Miller's regimented style. But since Miller was joining the military, he convinced May to stay on until the band broke up. May finally said around 1995, after a life of heavy drinking and rehabilitation for alcoholism, that working with Miller "helped me immensely. I learned a lot from Glenn. He was a good musician and an excellent arranger."

Later career

When the Big Bands ended in the late 1940s, May relocated to Los Angeles, where he became a much-coveted arranger and studio orchestra leader, working for top recording stars of the day including Frank Sinatra, Rosemary Clooney, Anita O'Day and Bing Crosby.

With Capitol Records 

At Capitol, May wrote arrangements for many top artists. These included Frank Sinatra on the albums Come Fly with Me (1958), Come Dance with Me! (1959) and Come Swing with Me! (1961); Nat King Cole on the albums Just One of Those Things and Let's Face the Music!, as well as numerous singles (all his work with Cole being packaged later on the 2-CD set The Billy May Sessions); Peggy Lee on the albums Pretty Eyes and Christmas Carousel; Sue Raney on her second album Songs for a Raney Day; Vic Damone on the albums The Lively Ones and Strange Enchantment; Jeri Southern on the album Jeri Southern Meets Cole Porter; Keely Smith on the album Politely and on a duet single, "Nothing In Common"/"How Are Ya Fixed For Love?", with Sinatra; Bobby Darin on the album Oh! Look at Me Now; Nancy Wilson on the albums Like In Love, Something Wonderful, Tender Loving Care, Nancy - Naturally! and various tracks from the albums Just For Now and Lush Life; Matt Monro on several tracks from the albums Invitation to the Movies, Invitation to Broadway, and These Years; Bing Crosby and Rosemary Clooney on the albums That Travelin' Two-Beat and Fancy Meeting You Here; and Sir George Shearing on the albums Satin Affair and Burnished Brass, co-arranged with Shearing (May also conducted Shearing's album Concerto for My Love, on which Shearing had sole credit for the arrangements). 

May's orchestra was featured on many Capitol Records children's projects, including cowboy star, Hopalong Cassidy. He worked closely with early 1950s satirist Stan Freberg, using his arranging skills to help Freberg create his spoofs of current hits by creating musical backing often stunningly close to the original hit single.

On Freberg's Wun'erful, Wun'erful! a lacerating spoof of bandleader Lawrence Welk, May hired some of Hollywood's best jazz musicians, who relished the idea of mocking the financially successful Welk sound, which they considered the routine of "square". The result was a note-perfect recreation of Welk's sound as Freberg and a group of vocalists performed parodies of Welk's "musical family". Freberg recounted that Welk was less than amused by the recording.

May also composed and conducted the music for Freberg's short-lived comedy radio series on CBS, which ran for 15 episodes in 1957. His sendup of trashy horror-film music ("Gray Flannel Hat Full of Teenage Werewolves") is notable.

May won two Grammy Awards, including Best Performance by an Orchestra in 1958 and Best Arrangement in 1959. Much of his work for Capitol has been reissued on the Ultra-Lounge CD series.

In the late 1960's into the early 1970's, May conducted many recreations of big band era classics, recorded by Capitol. May transcribed note for note from the original recordings of big band legends such as Charlie Barnet, Glenn Miller, Benny Goodman and others and then conducted a group of all-star veteran musicians on the sessions, including some of the original performers such as singers Helen Forrest, Helen Ward and Tex Beneke. The Time-Life label released these as boxed sets titled as "The Swing Era," whose marketing was focused on the fact that these high-fidelity stereo recordings allowed listeners to enjoy the music with a depth and realism that the 78 rpm recordings of that era had never been able to fully capture.

Other record labels 
The Crosby-Clooney collaboration was a sequel to their earlier, more successful album on RCA Victor, Fancy Meeting You Here, also arranged by May, whose other non-Capitol work included another Bing Crosby duet album, this time with Louis Armstrong, entitled Bing & Satchmo; a further duet album twinning Bobby Darin with Johnny Mercer (Two of a Kind); the sixth in Ella Fitzgerald's acclaimed series of Song Books for Verve Records, Ella Fitzgerald Sings the Harold Arlen Songbook; similar dips into Cole Porter and Rodgers and Hart with Anita O'Day (Anita O'Day Swings Cole Porter with Billy May and Anita O'Day and Billy May Swing Rodgers and Hart; both on Verve); Mel Tormé's Latin-flavoured album (¡Olé Tormé!: Mel Tormé Goes South of the Border with Billy May); Jane Russell's self-titled album on MGM Records in 1958; early albums by Jack Jones (Shall We Dance?) and Petula Clark (In Hollywood); one solitary session with Sarah Vaughan for Roulette Records in 1960, to record the single "The Green Leaves of Summer" and three other tracks. May arranged and conducted Once More with Feeling, a 1960 studio album by singer Billy Eckstine on Roulette.

May also arranged and recorded one album in Cleveland with Cosmic Records; Guess Who for artist Jerry Lee (Jerry Principe) at the Golden Key Club; and two more albums with Keely Smith, recorded nearly 40 years apart: CheroKeely Swings from 1962; and Keely Sings Sinatra, one of May's last projects, from 2001.

After Sinatra left Capitol to start his own label, Reprise Records, May continued to provide arrangements for him, off and on, for nearly thirty more years, working on the albums Sinatra Swings, Francis A. & Edward K. (with Duke Ellington) and Trilogy 1: The Past, as well as the chart for one of Sinatra's last ever solo recordings, "Cry Me a River" (1988).

May arranged Sinatra's knockabout duet with Sammy Davis Jr., "Me and My Shadow", which was a hit single on both sides of the Atlantic in 1962, while he contributed to Sinatra's ambitious "Reprise Musical Repertory Theatre" project, providing a few arrangements for three of its four albums, South Pacific, Kiss Me, Kate and Guys and Dolls, May's charts being variously performed by Sinatra, Davis, Crosby, Dean Martin, Jo Stafford and Lou Monte and yielding a perennial Sinatra concert favourite, "Luck Be a Lady" from Guys and Dolls.

In 1958, May arranged a Christmas album on Warner Bros. Records featuring The Jimmy Joyce Singers, titled A Christmas to Remember. In 1983, May arranged the song "He Came Here For Me" for the Carpenters' An Old-Fashioned Christmas album on A&M Records.

Musical style 
May's charts often featured brisk tempos and intricate brass parts. One distinctive feature is his frequent use of trumpet mute devices. Another was a saxophone glissando, widely known as his "slurping saxes". In slower tempos, he sometimes utilized string sections; good examples of this aspect of his work include his brass chart for "These Foolish Things (Remind Me of You)" on the Cole album Just One of Those Things; his string arrangement of "April in Paris" on Sinatra's Come Fly With Me album; and his arrangement of "I Can't Get Started" on Keely Smith's Politely, which includes a nod to May in the lyrics ("Billy May arranged this for me").

Film and television 

May can be seen on trumpet with the Glenn Miller Orchestra in Sun Valley Serenade (1941), including a solo in In the Mood, and Orchestra Wives (1942).

In 1957, May made his debut as film composer with Jane Russell's The Fuzzy Pink Nightgown and the soundtrack was released on Imperial Records. His film scores include the Rat Pack film Sergeants 3 (1962), Johnny Cool (1963), Tony Rome (1967), The Secret Life of an American Wife (1968), The Ballad of Andy Crocker (1969), and The Front Page (1974) and several big band arrangements used in the 1991 Disney film, "The Rocketeer."

His compositions for television include "Somewhere in the Night", the theme for Naked City (1960), and his jazzy arrangement of Flight of the Bumblebee for The Green Hornet (1966) with trumpet by Al Hirt. He composed the Batgirl theme for Batman (1966). He and Nelson Riddle wrote music for episodes of Naked City (1960), Batman (1966), The Green Hornet (1966), Emergency! (1972), and CHiPs (1977).

May also arranged and produced the song "River of No Return" for Tennessee Ernie Ford for the 1954 film of the same name starring Marilyn Monroe and Robert Mitchum. Billy May and His Orchestra is also credited as playing themselves in the film Nightmare (1956), starring Edward G. Robinson, and May as music and vocal arranger of music by Herschel Burke Gilbert, who was the musical director.

Compositions 
May's compositions included "Long Tall Mama" and "Measure for Measure", recorded with the Glenn Miller Orchestra, "Boom Shot", written with Miller (May's wife Arletta originally received credit as co-author in his place) for the soundtrack of the 1942 movie Orchestra Wives, "Harlem Chapel Bells", which was performed with Glenn Miller and his Orchestra on April 2, 1941 and broadcast on the Chesterfield Moonlight Serenade radio program, "Lean Baby", "Fat Man Boogie", "Ping Pong", "Jooms Jones", "Gabby Goose", "Lumby", "Daisy Mae" and "Friday Afternoon" with Hal McIntyre, "Miles Behind", "The Wrong Idea" with Charlie Barnet, "Wings Over Manhattan", "Filet of Soul", "Mayhem", "Gin and Tonic", and "Solving the Riddle".

But his biggest hit as a composer was the children's song "I Tawt I Taw a Puddy Tat", which he recorded with Mel Blanc in 1950.

Another arrangement, "Be My Host", served as the winner's fanfare on The Newlywed Game and was played after host Bob Eubanks announced the winning couple.

Selected recordings 
May arranged and conducted for many prominent singers. This list highlights some of his recordings that focused on his own bands, compositions and arrangements.

Singles 
1952: "Charmaine" (Capitol 1919) charted for two weeks, peaked at No. 17
1954: "Don't Worry 'Bout Me" (Capitol F2787) reached No. 17 in the Billboard charts that year. Although Nelson Riddle conducted the session, Sinatra cites Billy May as the arranger during a May 1978 performance in Las Vegas.
1956: "Main title from The Man With the Golden Arm" (Capitol 3372) charted for fourteen weeks, peaked at No. 49; and UK No. 9

Albums 
 1948 Join the Band
 1952 A Band Is Born
 1952 A Big Band Bash
 1953 Billy May's Bacchanalia
 1954 Sorta-Dixie
 1955 Sorta-May
 1955 Naughty Operetta
 1955 Arthur Murray Cha Cha Mambos
 1957 Jimmy Lunceford in Hi-Fi
 1957 Plays for Fancy Dancin' 
 1958 Billy May's Big Fat Brass
 1960 Cha Cha! Billy May
 1960 The Girls and Boys on Broadway
 1962 The Sweetest Swingin' Sounds of Billy May
 1962 Process 70
 1963 Bill's Bag
 1966 Billy May Today!

References

Bibliography

External links 
 [ Billy May profile] at Allmusic
National Association of Music Merchants Oral History Interview with Billy May, namm.org, April 4, 2002
Billy May arrangements, 1939-1995 at the Library of Congress

1916 births
2004 deaths
American male composers
American music arrangers
Big band bandleaders
People from San Juan Capistrano, California
Grammy Award winners
Musicians from Pittsburgh
Capitol Records artists
Jazz arrangers
20th-century American composers
20th-century American male musicians
Male jazz musicians
Glenn Miller Orchestra members